The Embassy of Egypt in Washington, D.C. is the diplomatic mission of the Arab Republic of Egypt to the United States. It is located at 3521 International Court, Northwest, Washington, D.C., in the Cleveland Park neighborhood.

The embassy also operates Consulates-General in Chicago, Houston, Los Angeles, and New York City.

The Ambassador is  Yasser Reda.

Events
In 2011 the embassy was the site of protests as a part of the Arab Spring.

See also
 List of diplomatic missions of Egypt

References

External links

Official website
wikimapia

Egypt
Washington, D.C.
Egypt–United States relations
North Cleveland Park